The family Jeholodentidae is a possible eutriconodont family that was present in China around 125 million years ago during the time of the dinosaurs.  There are currently two genera assigned to the family, Yanoconodon and Jeholodens.

However, recent studies have shown it to be paraphyletic in relation to Triconodontidae, with Yanoconodon being closer to them than to Jeholodens.

Taxonomy
 Family †Jeholodentidae Luo et al. 2007
 Genus †Yanoconodon Luo, Chen, Li & Chen 2007
 Species †Yanoconodon allini Luo, Chen, Li & Chen 2007
 Genus †Jeholodens Ji, Luo & Ji 1999
 Species †Jeholodens jenkinsi Ji, Luo & Ji 1999

References

External links

Eutriconodonts
Prehistoric mammal families
Early Cretaceous first appearances
Early Cretaceous extinctions
Taxa named by Zhe-Xi Luo
Taxa named by Peiji Chen
Taxa named by Gang Li
Taxa named by Meng Chen (paleontologist)